Promise to Love is the fifth studio album by American singer Kem. It was released by Motown Records on August 25, 2014. The album debuted and peaked at number three on the US Billboard 200.

Critical reception

Andy Kellman, writing for Allmusic, found that "as with the three albums that preceded it, Promise to Love consists almost entirely of smooth and quiet ballads that regard long-term devotion and self-improvement. [Kem] remains an antidote to prevailing contemporary R&B sounds. When he sings of going downtown, he means geographically, not anatomically – and guest Snoop Dogg, on his best behavior, displays restraint. [...] Kem might do one thing, but he does that one thing very well. Four- and five-year waits aside, the man knows how to please his listeners."

Track listing

Charts

Weekly charts

Year-end charts

Release history

References

2014 albums
Kem (singer) albums